PartyTime is The Cheeky Girls' debut album. It reached number 14 in the UK Albums Chart in 2003.

Track listing
 "Cheeky Song (Touch My Bum)" – 3:24
 "Salsa in the Disco" – 3:15
 "Take Your Shoes Off" – 2:58
 "Get the Party On" – 3:30
 "Celebration" – 3:12
 "Summer Fun" – 3:02
 "Hooray Hooray (It's a Cheeky Holiday)" – 3:04
 "Mickey Blue" – 4:00
 "Hip Hop" – 3:30
 "Magic" – 3:00
 "Española Dream" – 3:24
 "Follow My Star" – 3:27

Later re-release bonus tracks
<li>"We Go Together" – 2:50
<li>"Megamix" – 3:30
<li>"Have a Cheeky Christmas" – 3:10

Enhanced section
 "The Cheeky Song (Touch My Bum)"
 "Take Your Shoes Off"
 "Hooray Hooray (It's a Cheeky Holiday)"

Personnel
The following personnel contributed to PartyTime:

Cheeky Girls
 Monica Irimia
 Gabriela Irimia

Additional musicians
 Marcus Hutton – Synth  (on "Take Your Shoes Off") 
 Archie Merrington – Backup Synth  (on "Take Your Shoes Off")

References

2003 debut albums
The Cheeky Girls albums